The 1972 United States House of Representatives election in Alaska was held on November 7, 1972, to elect the United States representative from Alaska's at-large congressional district. Incumbent Democratic Representative Nick Begich went missing shortly before the general election, but still defeated Republican nominee Don Young.

This was the last time that a Democrat won Alaska's House seat until 2022’s special election, when Mary Peltola was elected to succeed the late Young.

Primary
On February 10, 1972, incumbent Representative Nick Begich announced that he would seek reelection to the House of Representatives. He had considered running for the Democratic senatorial nomination against Republican Senator Ted Stevens, but chose to run for reelection and reaffirmed his intention on March 27.

On April 7, Don Young, a member of the Alaska Senate, stated that he was considering running for the Republican nomination for Alaska's congressional district. At the Republican Party's state convention, the party gave its support to Young, although he had not formally announced his candidacy for the House of Representatives. On May 22, Young announced his candidacy after filing to run in Juneau.

On June 1, Bruce Dickerson Stevens filed to run for the Republican nomination, but did not actively campaign in the primary.

On August 22, the open primary was held in which Begich placed first with nearly 70% of the popular vote, Young placed second with 25.60%, and Stevens placed third with less than 5%.

Candidates
Nick Begich, member of the United States House of Representatives from Alaska's at-large congressional district (1971–1972)
Bruce Dickerson Stevens, candidate in the 1970 United States House of Representatives election in Alaska
Don Young, member of the Alaska House of Representatives (1967–1971) and Alaska Senate (1971–1973)

Results

General election
On September 6, 1972, Young challenged Begich to debate him, and Begich accepted on September 14. Four or five debates were planned to be held between Begich and Young, but Begich disappeared on October 16, while traveling by airplane with House Majority Leader Hale Boggs.

On October 19, Young suspended his campaign activities until Begich was found, but later resumed campaigning on October 28. Young stated that he believed that he was "doing what I think is best for the state" as if Begich was never found or discovered to have died then Alaska could not have a representative for six months until a special election was held to fill Begich's vacancy. House Minority Leader Gerald Ford stated that Alaska would possibly risk its seniority in the House of Representatives and House committee assignments if Young was not elected.

However, despite Young and Ford's statements, Begich won reelection with 56.24% of the popular vote against Young's 43.76%.
Begich never reappeared and was declared dead in absentia in December 1972. His body was never found.

Results

See also
1972 United States House of Representatives elections

References

1972
Alaska
1972 Alaska elections